St. Johnsville is a village in Montgomery County, New York, United States. The population was 1,732 at the 2010 census. Accounts vary as to the etymology of the  name, but most of these  credit Alexander St. John, an early surveyor and commissioner, while still others credit an early name for the area, St. John's Church.

The Village of St. Johnsville is in the southern part of the Town of St. Johnsville and lies between Utica and Amsterdam. In 2019, almost the entire village was listed on the National Register of Historic Places as the St. Johnsville Historic District.

History 
The area was within the territory of the Mohawk tribe when Europeans first entered the Mohawk Valley. Palatine Germans began settling the area in the early 18th century.

The community was first settled circa 1775.

A small battle was fought during the American Revolution in 1780 near Fort Klock, which lies to the east of St. Johnsville.

St. Johnsville village was incorporated in 1857.

On  June 28, 2006, St. Johnsville faced its worst flood in one hundred years.

The Bates-Englehardt Mansion, Stone Grist Mill Complex, and United States Post Office are listed on the National Register of Historic Places.  The Margaret Reaney Memorial Library was added in 2012.

In 2016, St. Johnsville's first organic chicken farm, Simple Coop Organics, opened.  Simple Coop invested in the community with scenic rental properties.

Geography
St. Johnsville is located at  (42.999674, -74.678386).

According to the United States Census Bureau, the village has a total area of 0.9 square mile (2.2 km2), all  land.

The village is on the north bank of the Mohawk River and the Erie Canal.  Zimmermann Creek, a tributary of the Mohawk, flows through the village.

New York State Route 5 passes through the village as Main Street.

Demographics

As of the census of 2000, there were 1,685 people, 693 households, and 410 families residing in the village.  The population density was 1,967.3 people per square mile (756.5/km2).  There were 774 housing units at an average density of 903.7 per square mile (347.5/km2).  The racial makeup of the village was 98.87% White, 0.12% Black or African American, 0.53% Native American, 0.18% Asian, and 0.30% from two or more races. Hispanic or Latino of any race were 1.31% of the population.

There were 693 households, out of which 24.8% had children under the age of 18 living with them, 41.1% were married couples living together, 12.8% had a female householder with no husband present, and 40.8% were non-families. 35.8% of all households were made up of individuals, and 20.5% had someone living alone who was 65 years of age or older.  The average household size was 2.26 and the average family size was 2.90.

In the village, the population was spread out, with 22.2% under the age of 18, 8.3% from 18 to 24, 23.2% from 25 to 44, 21.4% from 45 to 64, and 24.9% who were 65 years of age or older.  The median age was 42 years. For every 100 females, there were 87.0 males.  For every 100 females age 18 and over, there were 83.1 males.

The median income for a household in the village was $28,043, and the median income for a family was $37,431. Males had a median income of $28,523 versus $21,115 for females. The per capita income for the village was $14,467.  About 11.6% of families and 14.4% of the population were below the poverty line, including 22.7% of those under age 18 and 7.4% of those age 65 or over.

References

External links
  St. Johnsville Chamber of Commerce
  Village of St. Johnsville

Villages in New York (state)
Villages in Montgomery County, New York
Historic districts on the National Register of Historic Places in New York (state)
National Register of Historic Places in Montgomery County, New York
Populated places on the Mohawk River